Flaunden is a village and a civil parish in Hertfordshire, England, close to the border with Buckinghamshire. Old Flaunden was on the banks of the River Chess in Buckinghamshire but owing to constant flooding, the settlement moved up the hill into Hertfordshire in the early 19th century.  The new church at the top of the hill was built in 1838 and was the first church designed by Sir George Gilbert Scott.

The former Baptist chapel in Flaunden dates from 1836 and closed in 1985. It is now a private residence but the chapel's graveyard remains alongside.

Flaunden has two pubs: The Bricklayers Arms and The Green Dragon, a Grade II listed building dating from the early 17th century which is on the Campaign for Real Ale's National Inventory of Historic Pub Interiors.

Gallery

References

External links

Villages in Hertfordshire
Dacorum
Civil parishes in Hertfordshire